Pirate FM is an Independent Local Radio station owned and operated by Bauer and based in Cornwall. The station forms part of the Hits Radio network, although its entire output and playlist is locally produced and takes no network programming.

As of December 2022, the station broadcasts to a weekly audience of 138,000 according to RAJAR.

Background
The station was launched in 1992 under the name of Pirate FM 102 with the voice of breakfast presenter Roger Day (a well-known ex-pirate DJ from Radio Caroline and Radio North Sea International). The station's launch Chief Executive was Mike Powell who specified digital technology so advanced at the time that it was featured on the BBC science programme, Tomorrow's World.

Much of the early success of the station was due to the technical expertise of the first managing director Richard Lawley, who was also a graduate electronic engineer. He was succeeded by the station's initial sales director Joseph Swain. The station has also won numerous awards including 'Station of the Year' (in the 300,000 to 1 million potential audience category) at the 2003 and 2006 Sony Radio Academy awards.

In September 2005, the station's branding changed from The Southwest's Pirate FM to Cornwall's Pirate FM. Listenership appears to have increased in Cornwall following the move, however it reduced their audience in West Devon (including Plymouth, where Pirate FM had a separate office and studio prior to the rebrand). From "Quarter 4" 2006 Pirate FM's survey area (TSA) was reduced by removing Plymouth & most of West Devon, thus reducing the potential audience significantly but focusing on the core Cornish audience. Pirate FM remains as the number one station by audience reach despite the increased competition.

The Pirate Trust is the charitable arm of Pirate FM that raises thousands of pounds yearly for good causes in Cornwall with their 'Cornwall in Need Appeal'. Yearly fundraisers include the 'Garden Party' and the all-day on-air and online auction known as 'Radiothon'. Radiothon [2007] and Radiothon [2008] were both run in collaboration with free classifieds website itsmymarket.com

Almost all programming is produced and presented locally. Until 2018, Pirate FM broadcast The Vodafone Big Top 40 chart show (previously The Pepsi Chart & Hit40UK) which was produced from Capital FM in London and syndicated across over 140 commercial radio stations in the UK. However, the show was withdrawn from syndication in 2018 and now broadcasts solely on Heart & Capital stations. In February 2021, the station, along with Lincs FM, began syndicating the UK Chart Show, from Bauer's Hits Radio network, on Sunday afternoons.

News service

Pirate FM produces local news bulletins from its Redruth studios between 6am and 6pm on weekdays and at weekends and bank holidays. Bulletins are broadcast every hour, on the hour with headlines on weekdays at 6:30am, 7:30am, 8:30am and 5:30pm.

National news bulletins from Sky News Radio in London are broadcast on the hour at all other times.

Pirate 2

Pirate 2 DAB launched on 4 August 2014.

The station airs a series of weekly talk shows:
The Business Hub (Mondays, 7pm),
the Health and Wellbeing Show (Tuesdays, 7pm),
the Education and Training Show (Wednesdays, 7pm),
the Farming Show (Thursdays, 7pm),
the Homes and Gardens Show (Fridays, 7pm),
the Youth Show (Saturdays, 4pm).

Transmission details
Pirate FM's two transmitters broadcast separate opt-outs for news bulletins, travel information and advertising. The Redruth transmitter on 102.8 MHz FM includes content for the mid and west of the county of Cornwall, and the Caradon Hill transmitter (on 102.2 MHz FM) covers the East and North of the county, as well as Plymouth and West Devon.

Branding
Pirate FM has two current on air straplines: "Real Music Variety" and "Love Cornwall Love Music Love Pirate FM".

Its current imaging voiceovers are Rik Scott and Gina Mellotte. It's jingle package is a creation of Falmouth-based Bespoke Music.

Pirate FM's original jingles were sung by JAM productions, Dallas in 1992, which included the famous "Tamar Bridges" Cornwall theme tune (lyrics by launch Chief Executive, Mike Powell), which used to be played after midnight and before 6am every day.  That image song was a cut from a package called "Yours Truly".  The original Pirate FM jingle package was a selection of cuts from two packages originally created for Detroit's Q95.5.  The packages were Q Cuts and Right on Q.  In addition, Pirate FM also bought a couple of cuts from the Turbo Z package originally produced for Z-100 in New York.

In the late 1990s, Pirate FM returned to JAM to update their package.  That time, they used cuts from the Hi Qume, Uni-Que and Quick Q's packages produced for Detroit's Q95.5, as well as a couple of cuts from Breakthrough, which JAM produced for WPLJ/Power 95.5 in New York.

A new jingle package was first aired in December 2005, made by jingle production company IQ Beats. It was a re-recording of a previous package made for Heart 106.2 in London.

Previous Pirate FM straplines are "More music for Cornwall", "Real music variety", "Better variety, more music", "The world's greatest music", "Greatest memories, latest hits" and "The latest technology, and the best records too".

As of 2023, Pirate FM has taken on the Hits Radio Network slogan 'The Biggest Hits, The Biggest Throwbacks' alongside 'Love Cornwall, Love Music'.

Mascot

Intermittently since 1992, Pirate FM have employed a mascot that accompanies the broadcast team to events. From launch until the early 2000s, the character was known as "Jasper Parrot". Recent years have seen Pirate FM revisit the concept with a new parrot character, named "Dreckly" after an audience vote.

Expansion

Pirate FM was one of the two stations that applied for the licence to serve Plymouth after the licence was handed back by Macquarie's Diamond FM. The UKRD plan to extend Pirate's service under the name Plymouth's Pirate FM lost out to Radio Plymouth.

References

External links

The Pirate FM Website
The Pirate 2 Website

Companies based in Cornwall
Radio stations in Cornwall
Radio stations established in 1992
Bauer Radio